Prince Rose (1928–1944) was a British-bred, Belgian-trained Thoroughbred racehorse, often referred to as the best horse in Belgian racing.

Background
Bred in England by Lord Durham, Prince Rose was sired by Rose Prince out of the mare Indolence. His grandsire was Prince Palatine, a two-time British Horse of the Year and his damsire was Gay Crusader, winner of the 1917 English Triple Crown.

The Earl of Durham died in 1929 and his estate sold Prince Rose to Henri Coppez (1869–1946) who brought him to Belgium.

Racing career
At age three, Prince Rose won the Grand Prix de Bruxelles, beat the great French filly Pearl Cap in the Grand International d'Ostende then was third to her in the 1931 Prix de l'Arc de Triomphe. In 1932, Prince Rose won the Prix du President de la Republique at Hippodrome de Saint-Cloud.

Stud record
Retired to stud duty after winning sixteen races in twenty starts, Prince Rose sired seven offspring in Belgium before being sent to the Haras de Cheffreville breeding Farm in France in 1938 where he would produce another thirty-five. 

However, most important for horse racing in the United States, in 1939 Prince Rose had been mated with the mare Cosquilla who,  because of the onset of World War II, was shipped to safety in Ireland. There, Cosquilla foaled Princequillo who would eventually be sent to race in the U.S. and who would become a very influential stallion. Prince Rose was killed by military gunfire in 1944.

Legacy
Prince Rose is the grandsire of the U.S. Champion filly Misty Morn and U.S. Racing Hall of Fame colts Hill Prince and Round Table. Other important descendants of Prince Rose include Mill Reef, Fort Marcy, Sham, and 1973 U.S. Triple Crown champion Secretariat.

Honours
The Grand International d'Ostende at Hippodrome Wellington in Ostend was renamed the Grand Prix Prince Rose in his honor.

Pedigree

References

 Prince Rose's pedigree and racing stats

1928 racehorse births
1944 racehorse deaths
Racehorses bred in the United Kingdom
Racehorses trained in Belgium
Champion Thoroughbred Sires of France
Thoroughbred family 10-c
Chefs-de-Race